Sabella pavonina, commonly known as the peacock worm, is a marine polychaete worm belonging to the family Sabellidae. They can be found along the coasts of Western Europe and the Mediterranean. It is found in shallow, tidal waters with a bed of mud, sand or gravel. It is sometimes found on rocks or shipwrecks.

It is 10-25 centimetres in length. Its body is elongated and divided into 100-600 small segments. The head has two fans of feathery tentacles arising from fleshy, semi-circular lobes. The body is mostly grey-green while the tentacles are brown, red or purple with darker bands.

The worm lives inside a smooth tube of fine mud or sand particles held together with mucus. The tube stands upright with the lower end attached to stones and the upper end protruding from the sea bed. When covered by water, the worm extends its tentacles out of the tube to feed by filtering out small food particles. At low tide or when disturbed, it withdraws back into the tube.

References

Barrett, John & Yonge, C. M. (1977) Collins Pocket Guide to the Sea Shore, Collins, London.
Forey, Pamela & Fitzsimons, Cecilia (1994) Letts Pocket Guide to Sea & Seashore Life, Letts, London.
Naylor, Paul (2003) Great British Marine Animals, Sound Diving Publications.

External links
ARKive - images and video
 

Sabellida
Animals described in 1820
Taxa named by Marie Jules César Savigny